The Maute group ( or ), also known as the Islamic State of Lanao, was a radical Islamist group composed of former Moro Islamic Liberation Front guerrillas and foreign fighters led by Omar Maute, the alleged founder of a Dawlah Islamiya, or Islamic state, based in Lanao del Sur, Mindanao, Philippines. 
The group, which a Philippine Army brigade commander characterized as terrorist, had been conducting a protection racket in the remote settlements of Butig, Lanao del Sur. It had clashed on several occasions with Armed Forces of the Philippines troops, the most significant of which began in May 2017 and culminated in the Battle of Marawi.

It is listed as a terrorist organization by Malaysia and New Zealand.

History

Origin
The group, originally known as Dawlah Islamiya, was founded in 2012 by brothers Abdullah Maute and Omar Maute who were described by a source as "petty criminals" at the time. However, other sources have described the Maute family as wealthy and politically-connected. The matriarch, Ominta Romato Maute, also known as Farhana Maute, owns property in Mindanao and Manila, and runs a construction business. She is related to politicians in Butig, Lanao del Sur and is considered influential. She has been described  as the financier of the Maute group's activities, providing logistics and recruiting fighters.  Because of the involvement of the entire Maute family, the rise of the Maute Group is described as the rise of family terrorism in the Philippines.

Butig, the headquarters of the Maute group, is also a stronghold of the Moro Islamic Liberation Front and both groups are tied by blood or marriage. Abdullah and Omar Maute are first cousins of Azisa Romato, the wife of the late MILF Vice Chairman for Military Affairs Alim Abdul Aziz Mimbantas, who is buried in Butig. The Maute brothers themselves were once members of the MILF.

Early clashes with Philippine security forces
Philippine Army sources state that their initial encounter with the Maute group involved a firefight in 2013 when the insurgents attacked a security checkpoint the government troops were manning in Madalum, Lanao del Sur. The group was thought to have over 100 members then and were supplied with equipment by a foreign terrorist. They are said to be affiliated with Jemaah Islamiya, a Southeast Asian Islamist terrorist group.

The group was involved in a clash with Philippine Army troops in February 2016 that led to the capture of their headquarters in Butig, Lanao del Sur. There were reports that Omar Maute was killed in that clash. However, there were reports to the contrary, claiming that he escaped before the camp was overrun and was still alive; video footage found on a cellphone captured by Philippine government troops during the Battle of Marawi indicated that to be true. In November 2016, the Maute group seized the town of Butig, but were dislodged from their positions by Philippine security forces after about a week of fighting.

CNN has reported that two officers of the Philippine National Police had defected and joined the group.

Declaration of allegiance to Islamic State

The group pledged allegiance to the Islamic State in April 2015, along with the Ansar Khalifa Philippines terrorist organization, vowing to provide support for each other. However, according to former National Security Council senior consultant Ashley Acedillo, there are no indications that ISIS ever acknowledged the Maute group's pledge.

Although some reports indicate that the Maute group is regularly seen carrying black flags bearing the insignia of the Islamic State of Iraq and Syria, Butig town mayor Ibrahim Macadato has stated that the group is not affiliated with ISIS, but are merely armed residents. However, training manuals and other documents for militants under the Islamic State were recovered from their captured camp, indicating that the group may be trying to link up with ISIS.

A regional security expert in October 2016 stated that the Maute group was sophisticated in its use of social media and was able to attract students and teachers from the Mindanao State University in Marawi.

Rising terrorist activities
As ISIS suffers setbacks in Syria and Iraq, experts warn that hundreds of fighters from Indonesia and Malaysia will return to look for new opportunities to take the fight elsewhere, and the Maute group's pledge of loyalty to ISIS could serve as an incentive to join ranks with the organization. Since at least 2016, reports on jihadist activities in the Philippines and of Filipino fighters with ISIS indicate an increasing degree of coordination, cooperation, and cohesion between Southeast Asian jihadist militants and the Islamic State in Syria and Iraq.

The Maute group is said to be actively recruiting minors for service as "child warriors" and using the non-passage of the Bangsamoro Basic Law as propaganda. In April 2016, they abducted six sawmill workers from Butig, two of whom were later found beheaded. The group is also suspected of being behind a failed bomb plot in close proximity to the US embassy in Manila in November 2016.

Davao City bombing

On October 4, 2016, three men linked to the Maute group were arrested in connection with the 2016 Davao City bombing. The men were TJ Tagadaya Macabalang, Wendel Apostol Facturan, and Musali Mustapha. Defence Secretary Delfin Lorenzana said that the Maute group had established links with the Abu Sayyaf and that there are "indications" that the group is aligning themselves with ISIS. On November 28, the Philippine government finally officially acknowledged that Maute is linked to ISIS in a live televised comment by President Rodrigo Duterte who also revealed the financing of the Davao City bombing by illegal drug money indicating the presence of narcoterrorism in the Philippines.

Battle of Marawi

On May 23, 2017, the Maute group attacked Marawi City and later besieged by the Armed Forces of the Philippines. The attack resulted in the destruction of homes, the deaths and wounding of soldiers, policemen, and civilians, torching of a mosque, and a hospital being overrun. The former leader of Abu Sayyaf, Isnilon Hapilon was seen with the group during the attack. The attack resulted in President Duterte declaring a state of martial law across the entire island of Mindanao with the possibility that it be expanded nationwide.

Majority of the evacuees and refugees have been housed in different barangays in Iligan. On June 1, 2017, Iligan Mayor Celso G. Regencia issued an order to the residents, who legally possessed firearms, to shoot terrorists who trespass their properties.

Killing of the Maute brothers
Omar Maute was killed by the Armed Forces of the Philippines on October 16, 2017, along with former Abu Sayyaf chief Isnilon Hapilon. The group was later declared "practically wiped out" by the armed forces following the deaths of the seven Maute brothers. While the public was told not to worry about the group for now, younger members of the group might assume leadership.

After the Battle of Marawi
Remnants of the group were reportedly recruiting new members around Marawi in December 2017. The successor group has been labeled as the "Turaifie group" after its purported leader, Abu Turaifie. Abu Turaifie is the alias of Esmail Sheikh Abdulmalik, the leader of Jamaatul Muhaajireen Wal Ansar, a faction which split from the Bangsamoro Islamic Freedom Fighters.
In May 2018, the Philippine military alleged that Owayda Benito Marohomsar ( Abu Dar) was now the leader of the group. He had fled with dozens of Maute fighters during the Battle of Marawi and has since been active in recruiting new members using money looted from a local bank and the abandoned homes of wealthy residents.

Decline and eventual dissolution
On 24 January 2019, a fierce gunfight between security forces of the 103rd Infantry Battalion and terrorists of the Maute group left three soldiers injured and three terrorists injured in Barangay Sumalindao, Sultan Dumalondong, Lanao del Sur. Days earlier five militants surrendered to military near a military base in Lanao del Sur.

On 12 March, two IS-militants and two Philippine soldiers were killed and one soldier was injured during a gunfight in  Pagayawan, Lanao del Sur. The attack was blamed on the Dawlah Islamiyah Ranao, a remnant of the Maute-Abu Sayaff Group that led the siege of Marawi in May 2017. Days later on the 14 March four IS-linked Maute followers and three soldiers were killed while three other troops were missing following an intense firefight in barangay Dinaigan, Tubaran, Lanao del Sur, military officials said Friday. After the speculation of the death of the leader of this group a DNA test released in April confirmed that Maute leader Owayda Marohomsar, alias Abu Dar, was one of the four terrorists killed.

On 19 June, a Pakistani member called Waqar Ahmad, 36, was arrested and later deported. Morente said Ahmad was to undergo deportation proceedings for being an undesirable alien due to his alleged terrorist links and for working in the country without a permit. He was arrested after several days of intensive surveillance conducted by members of the PNP Regional Intelligence Unit 9 at the appliance store of his Pakistani uncle in the said city. The authorities suspect that the group planned to make an attack similar to the 2019 Indanan bombings. On 21 June, an Indonesian militant who fought alongside the Maute Group during the rebels siege of Marawi in 2017. The Taguig Regional Trial Court (RTC) Branch 266 has found Muhammad Ilham Syahputra guilty of the illegal possession of a handgun when he was arrested on November 1, 2017.

References

Rebel groups in the Philippines
Jihadist groups
Islamism in the Philippines
Factions of the Islamic State of Iraq and the Levant
Organisations designated as terrorist by New Zealand